The 1952 Brooklyn Dodgers rebounded from the heartbreaking ending of 1951 to win the National League pennant by four games over the New York Giants. However, they dropped the World Series in seven games to the New York Yankees. Led by Gil Hodges, Jackie Robinson, and Duke Snider, the high-powered Brooklyn offense scored the most runs in the majors.

Offseason
 October 16, 1951: Don Nicholas was purchased from the Dodgers by the Chicago White Sox.
 December 3, 1951: Toby Atwell was traded by the Dodgers to the Chicago Cubs for Carmen Mauro.
 December 6, 1951: Héctor Rodríguez was traded by the Dodgers to the Chicago White Sox for Rocky Nelson.

Regular season
 July 24, 1952: Duke Snider hit the 100th home run of his career. It was a walk-off version in the 11th inning off Frank Smith of the Cincinnati Reds.

Season standings

Record vs. opponents

Opening Day lineup

Notable transactions
 May 10, 1952: Marion Fricano was purchased from the Dodgers by the Philadelphia Athletics.
 June 9, 1952: Cal Abrams was traded by the Dodgers to the Cincinnati Reds for Rudy Rufer and cash.
 June 15, 1952: Bud Podbielan was traded by the Dodgers to the Cincinnati Reds for Bud Byerly and cash.

Roster

Player stats

Batting

Starters by position
Note: Pos = Position; G = Games played; AB = At bats; H = Hits; Avg. = Batting average; HR = Home runs; RBI = Runs batted in

Other batters
Note: G = Games played; AB = At bats; H = Hits; Avg. = Batting average; HR = Home runs; RBI = Runs batted in

Pitching

Starting pitchers
Note: G = Games pitched; IP = Innings pitched; W = Wins; L = Losses; ERA = Earned run average; SO = Strikeouts

Other pitchers
Note: G = Games pitched; IP = Innings pitched; W = Wins; L = Losses; ERA = Earned run average; SO = Strikeouts

Relief pitchers
Note: G = Games pitched; W = Wins; L = Losses; SV = Saves; ERA = Earned run average; SO = Strikeouts

1952 World Series

Game 1
October 1, 1952, at Ebbets Field in Brooklyn, New York

Game 2
October 2, 1952, at Ebbets Field in Brooklyn, New York

Game 3
October 3, 1952, at Yankee Stadium in New York City

Game 4
October 4, 1952, at Yankee Stadium in New York City

Game 5
October 5, 1952, at Yankee Stadium in New York City

Game 6
October 6, 1952, at Ebbets Field in Brooklyn, New York

Game 7
October 7, 1952, at Ebbets Field in Brooklyn, New York

Awards and honors
National League Rookie of the Year
Joe Black
TSN Rookie of the Year Award
Joe Black

All-Stars 
1952 Major League Baseball All-Star Game
Roy Campanella starter
Jackie Robinson starter
Carl Furillo reserve
Gil Hodges reserve
Pee Wee Reese reserve
Preacher Roe reserve
Duke Snider reserve
TSN Major League All-Star Team
Jackie Robinson

League top five finishers
Gil Hodges
 #2 in NL in walks (107)
 #3 in NL in home runs (32)
 #4 in NL in RBI (102)

Billy Loes
 #4 in NL in ERA (2.69)

Pee Wee Reese
 MLB leader in stolen bases (30)

Jackie Robinson
 MLB leader in on-base percentage (.440)
 #3 in NL in runs scored (104)
 #3 in NL in stolen bases (24)
 #3 in NL in walks (106)
 #4 in NL in batting average (.308)

Farm system

Notes

References
Baseball-Reference season page
Baseball Almanac season page

External links
1952 Brooklyn Dodgers uniform
Brooklyn Dodgers reference site
Acme Dodgers page 
Retrosheet

 
Los Angeles Dodgers seasons
Brooklyn Dodgers season
National League champion seasons
Jackie Robinson
1952 in sports in New York City
1950s in Brooklyn
Flatbush, Brooklyn